Truphosa Lai  (born ) is a retired Kenyan female volleyball player. She was part of the Kenya women's national volleyball team.

She participated in the 1994 FIVB Volleyball Women's World Championship. On club level she played with Kenya Posta.

Clubs
 Kenya Posta (1994)

References

External links

1969 births
Living people
Kenyan women's volleyball players
Place of birth missing (living people)